Wiipurilainen Osakunta (WiO) is one of the 15 student nations at the University of Helsinki, Finnish-speaking and established in 1653.

References

External links

1653 establishments in Sweden